Alaskan Knights, also known as Animal Rhythm is some reissues, is an animated cartoon by Columbia Pictures, part of the Krazy Kat series.

Plot
Travelling through the frosty landscape, Krazy rides on a sled pulled by a pack of huskies. At the end of his journey, he enters a saloon where he spends the rest of the film. The saloon is filled with dancing guests but Krazy stands by the counter.

Moments later, a beautiful female rat in a skirt and pumps shows up at the balcony before walking downstairs. She then approaches and selects Krazy to be her dance partner. They begin to strut their stuff.

After Krazy and the rat sat by a table where they each drank a mug of ale, and play a tune of "Oh! Susanna", the cat decides to have fun on his own. He then picks up a bow and comes to a table occupied by a sleeping hefty patron. Getting carried away, Krazy pulls one of the hefty patron's mustaches and rubs the bow on them as if they were violin strings. In no time, that patron wakes up annoyed and gives Krazy an intimidating gaze. But before an attack could be delivered, Krazy takes a pin, and pricks his would-be-attacker who then explodes. In this, a group of smaller and harmless versions of the patron appeared and started dancing merrily. Krazy and the rat went on to join the celebration.

Reception
A reviewer remarked "Krazy Kat in his best form ... in the Alaskan locale, among snow, dogsleds and saloons full of grizzly miners."

Miscellany
Though Krazy's date in the short is a rat, her clothes suggests she is a prototype for the spaniel who would appear later in the same year.
The short is available in the Columbia Cartoon Collection: Volume 1.

See also
 Krazy Kat filmography

References

External links

Alaskan Knights at the Big Cartoon Database

1930 films
1930 animated films
American black-and-white films
Krazy Kat shorts
Columbia Pictures short films
1930s American animated films
American animated short films
Films set in Alaska
Animated films about mice
Columbia Pictures animated short films
Screen Gems short films